The 2003 Red Square bombing was the 9 December 2003 suicide bombing on Mohovaja street in Moscow.

According to police, a female suicide bomber set off an explosive belt on a busy street close to the Moscow Kremlin, killing six people and injuring 44. Moscow's mayor Yuri Luzhkov reported speculation that the bomber had intended to target the nearby Moscow City Hall or State Duma instead.  According to the investigation, the suicide bomber was identified as Khadishat (in other sources - Khedizhi) Mangerieva, a widow of a Chechen rebel commander of Kurchaloyevsky District, Ruslan Mangeriev, who was killed during the Second Chechen War.

Inga Gizoeva's role
One of the victims, Inga (Inna) Gizoeva, was suspected to be a helper of Mangerieva. After speculation, several Russian newspapers printed apologies to Gizoeva's parents.

Notes

References

External links
 Six die in Moscow suicide blast BBC News
 Fear on the streets of Moscow BBC News
 Russians look for 'female bomber' CNN

21st-century mass murder in Russia
2003 in Russia
Events in Moscow
Mass murder in 2003
Suicide bombing in the Chechen wars
Terrorist incidents in Russia in 2003
Terrorist incidents of the Second Chechen War
Terrorist incidents in Moscow
2003 in Moscow
Red Square
December 2003 events in Russia
2003 murders in Russia